Oak Park 921'o6 is an independent studio album and twelfth release overall by American gospel music singer Tonéx. It was made for Family Christian Stores exclusively. The Japanese version was released in 2007 through Syntax Records. It contains new tracks not included on the 2006 version.

Track listing for 2006 version

 California 2006
 Checkmate
 Anthony
 Chollas Parkway
 U Need The Master
 Tippy
 Alright
 Can't U See?
 You
 My Friend (featuring Chizmatonic)
 Like
 Stones (featuring Jeff Mayors)
 Fail U
 God'z Got It
 Priceless
 Now
 Out The Game (featuring Gibraan)
 When My Words
 Feelings (featuring Karen Carpenter)
 Stay
 Sometimes
 Yahtzee
 Yes (featuring Montell Jordan)
 Deliver

Track listing for 2007 Japanese release  

 Now
 Alright
 You
 Holy-NESS
 Can't U See?
 Priceless
 Fail U
 Out The Game (featuring Gibraan)
 Feelings (featuring Karen Carpenter)
 Yes (featuring Montell Jordan)
 Like
 Anthony
 My Friend (featuring Chizmatonic)
 Tippy (featuring Rhonda Patton)
 God'z Got It
 HUP! (featuring Omega)

External links
Greene, Jo-Ann "[ Oak Park 921'06 review]", allmusic, Macrovision Corporation
Oak Park 921'o6 at Family Christian Stores

2006 albums
Tonéx albums